Scream Street is a children's  stop motion animated comedy-horror television series, airing on the CBBC channel in the United Kingdom. It is a series based on the books of the same name by Tommy Donbavand.

A second season was confirmed in 2020.

Plot
The series focuses on Luke Watson, a young boy who used to live a normal life with his parents. But after he starts turning into a werewolf, Luke and his parents are relocated to Scream Street, a town inhabited by monsters. Luke befriends two other residents of Scream Street, a vampire named Resus Negative and a mummy named Cleo Farr.

Production

Scream Street is a co-production between Factory, Coolabi Productions, ZDF Enterprises, and Ingenious Media for CBBC.

Cast

Main
Tyger Drew-Honey as Luke Watson, is an adventurous teenage boy, who has just discovered himself to be an unstable werewolf. 
Rasmus Hardiker as Resus Negative, a sarcastic yet funny, "rockstar vampire", who doesn't have vampire fangs, can't shapeshift into a bat and drinks tomato juice instead of blood.
Tala Gouveia as Cleo Farr, a 4,000-year-old mummy, who befriends Luke and Resus, despite knowing that they are going to grow older without her.
Claire Skinner as Sue Watson, Luke's mother, who tries her best to keep her family in check.
Skinner also voices Luella, Eefa's niece and Resus' admirer. 
She also voices Six, a new character who is introduced in the Series 2 and is a monster created by Dr. F.
Jim Howick as Mr Watson, Luke's father, an overly sensitive man who has yet to get used to life on Scream Street.
Debra Stephenson as Eefa, the witch.
John Thomson as Various Roles

Episodes

Series 1 (2015-17)

References

External links
 
 

2015 British television series debuts
2010s British animated television series
2010s British children's television series
2020s British animated television series
2020s British children's television series
British children's animated comedy television series
British children's animated horror television series
British stop-motion animated television series
English-language television shows
BBC children's television shows